Herrmann's catalyst is an organopalladium compound that is a popular catalyst for the Heck reaction. It is a yellow air-stable solid that is soluble in organic solvents. Under conditions for catalysis, the acetate group is lost and the Pd-C bond undergoes protonolysis, giving rise to a source of "".

The complex is made by reaction of tris(o-tolyl)phosphine with palladium(II) acetate:

Many analogues of Hermann's catalyst have been developed, e.g. palladacycles obtained from 2-aminobiphenyl.

References

Organopalladium compounds
Dimers (chemistry)
Phosphine complexes